Gene Frenkel may refer to:

Gene Frankel, actor and theater director (misspelling)
Gene Frenkle, fictitious character in "More Cowbell" (misspelling)